A radio program, radio programme, or radio show is a segment of content intended for broadcast on radio. It may be a one-time production, or part of a periodically recurring series. A single program in a series is called an episode.

Radio networks

International radio

In the 1950s, a small but growing cohort of rock and pop music fans, dissatisfied with the BBC's output, would listen to Radio Luxembourg – but only to some extent and probably not enough to have any impact on the BBC's monopoly; and invariably only at night, when the signal from Luxembourg could be received more easily. During the post-1964 period, offshore radio broadcasting from ships at anchor or abandoned forts (such as Radio Caroline) helped to supply the demand in western Europe for pop and rock music. The BBC launched its own pop music station, BBC Radio 1, in 1967.

International broadcasts became highly popular in major world languages. Of particular impact were programmes by the BBC World Service, Voice of America, Radio Moscow, China Radio International, Radio France Internationale, Deutsche Welle, Radio Free Europe/Radio Liberty, Vatican Radio and Trans World Radio.

Radio programming

Interest in old-time radio has increased in recent years with programs traded and collected on reel-to-reel tapes, cassettes and CDs and Internet downloads, as well as the popularity of podcasts.

Genres
 News and current affairs
 Radio comedy
 Radio drama
 Music shows

Well-known radio programs

United Kingdom
 Crossing Continents
 I'm Sorry I Haven't a Clue
 The Archers
 The Goon Show
 The Sky VIP Official Big Top 40

United States
 A Prairie Home Companion
 American Top 40
 Call Her Daddy
 Crime Junkie
 Democracy Now!
 Grand Ole Opry
 Morbid: A True Crime Podcast
 My Favorite Murder
 Stuff You Should Know
 The Daily

See also
 History of radio
 List of old-time radio people
 List of old-time radio programs

References

 
Program